Frederick Burton "Bud" Sellers (23 June 1918 – 16 June 2010) was an American philatelist who was added to the Roll of Distinguished Philatelists in 1986.

Sellers was added to the American Philatelic Society Hall of Fame in 2012.

References

Signatories to the Roll of Distinguished Philatelists
American philatelists
1918 births
2010 deaths
Fellows of the Royal Philatelic Society London